Russell James Lynn (August 16, 1890 – February 7, 1976) was a Canadian professional ice hockey player. He played with the New Westminster Royals of the Pacific Coast Hockey Association. He was also part of the 1913–14 Vancouver Millionaires but did not see any league action with the club.

References

1890 births
1976 deaths
Canadian ice hockey players
Ice hockey people from Ontario
New Westminster Royals players
People from Middlesex County, Ontario